Emilio Piersantelli (born 1888, date of death unknown) was an Italian sports shooter. He competed in the 25 m rapid fire pistol event at the 1924 Summer Olympics.

References

External links
 

1888 births
Year of death missing
Italian male sport shooters
Olympic shooters of Italy
Shooters at the 1924 Summer Olympics
People from Ascoli Piceno
Sportspeople from the Province of Ascoli Piceno